Julius Lippelt (5 December 1829, in Hamburg – 17 August 1864, in Hamburg) was a German sculptor.

Biography 
His father, a merchant, died while Julius was still young. After displaying his talents by modelling animals in clay, he received his basic artistic training from the sculptor, . In 1847, he was able to attend the Prussian Academy of Arts and work in the studios of Ludwig Wilhelm Wichmann. He spent 1859 in Italy, working on a commission for a statue of Venus and Adonis.

He was, however, able to complete only two of the four base figures ("Drama" and "Story"), when he died of tuberculosis, aged only thirty-four. The monument was completed by his friend and associate, . Just prior to his death, he had been awarded second place in a competition to create an equestrian monument, honoring Frederick William II of Prussia, in Cologne. 

He was interred at the Ohlsdorfer Friedhof.

Sources
 
 Carl Heitmann: Zeittafel der Geschichte der Hamburger Turnerschaft von 1816: 1816 – 1882. Herbst, Hamburg, 1883, S. 14. (online)

External links 

1829 births
1864 deaths
German sculptors
Prussian Academy of Arts alumni
19th-century deaths from tuberculosis
Artists from Hamburg
Tuberculosis deaths in Germany